Zbigniew Przybyszewski (1907–1952) was a Polish military officer and a Commander in the Polish Navy. During the early stages of World War II he served with distinction as the commanding officer of the coastal artillery station at Hel Peninsula. After the war he returned to Poland from a prisoner of war camp and resumed his service, rising to the post of CO Coastal Artillery and deputy commander of the Naval Branch of the General Staff. Arrested by Stalinist authorities under false charges of espionage, he was sentenced to death in a show trial and executed.

References

Polish military personnel
1907 births
1952 deaths